Beaska is a coat made of reindeer fur used by the Sami people, particularly in Torne. In Gällivare beaska means thicker fur and is mainly used by the richer people.  In Northern Sami language it could also mean newer fur as it was of young reindeer calves, which are themselves called peschki in some dialects. The Norwegian word for fur is pesk,  which comes from päsket- to cut. The Sami people also use the word muoddá (In Swedish: mudd).

See also
 Four Winds hat
 Luhkka
 Gákti

References

Coats (clothing)
Sámi clothing